Hydrangea davidii is a species of flowering plant in the family Hydrangeaceae, native to China.

External links

 Hydrangea davidii at www.efloras.com.

davidii
Flora of China